The knockout phase of UEFA Euro 2016 began on 25 June 2016 and ended on 10 July 2016 with the final in Saint-Denis, France, near Paris.

All times listed are Central European Summer Time (UTC+2)

Format
In the knockout phase, extra time and a penalty shoot-out were used to decide the winners if necessary. As with every tournament since UEFA Euro 1984, there was no third place play-off.

UEFA set out the following schedule for the round of 16:
 Match 1: Runners-up Group A vs Runners-up Group C
 Match 2: Winners Group D vs 3rd Place Group B/E/F
 Match 3: Winners Group B vs 3rd Place Group A/C/D
 Match 4: Winners Group F vs Runners-up Group E
 Match 5: Winners Group C vs 3rd Place Group A/B/F
 Match 6: Winners Group E vs Runners-up Group D
 Match 7: Winners Group A vs 3rd Place Group C/D/E
 Match 8: Runners-up Group B vs Runners-up Group F

Combinations of matches in the Round of 16
The specific match-ups involving the third-placed teams depended on which four third-placed teams qualified for the round of 16:

Qualified teams
The top two placed teams from each of the six groups qualified for the knockout stage, along with the four best third-placed teams.

Bracket

Round of 16

Switzerland vs Poland

Wales vs Northern Ireland

Croatia vs Portugal

France vs Republic of Ireland

Germany vs Slovakia

Hungary vs Belgium

Italy vs Spain

England vs Iceland
The match has been described as one of England's worst defeats ever. Former footballer and Talksport presenter Stan Collymore, who was commentating on the game, panned the England team, reserving special criticism for goalkeeper Joe Hart and captain Wayne Rooney. Former England international and BBC Sport pundit Alan Shearer described it as the worst performance he had ever seen from an England team. The defeat was called England's most shocking since losing 1–0 to the United States in the 1950 World Cup.

The English team was viciously mocked by the press who described it as a "second exit from Europe", as the United Kingdom had voted to leave the European Union just four days earlier. As a result, the match was seen as a national embarrassment. The English media criticized the team to be unfit and the fans to be unsportsmanlike.

Quarter-finals

Poland vs Portugal

Wales vs Belgium

Germany vs Italy

France vs Iceland

Semi-finals

Portugal vs Wales

Germany vs France

Final

References

External links

 UEFA Euro 2016 official history

UEFA Euro 2016
2016
France at UEFA Euro 2016
Switzerland at UEFA Euro 2016
Wales at UEFA Euro 2016
England at UEFA Euro 2016
Slovakia at UEFA Euro 2016
Germany at UEFA Euro 2016
Poland at UEFA Euro 2016
Northern Ireland at UEFA Euro 2016
Croatia at UEFA Euro 2016
Spain at UEFA Euro 2016
Italy at UEFA Euro 2016
Belgium at UEFA Euro 2016
Republic of Ireland at UEFA Euro 2016
Hungary at UEFA Euro 2016
Iceland at UEFA Euro 2016
Portugal at UEFA Euro 2016